Adverse or adverse interest, in law, is anything that functions contrary to a party's interest. This word should not be confused with averse.

Adverse possession
In property law, adverse possession refers to an interest in real property which is contrary to the in-fact owner of the property.  For example, an easement may permit some amount of access to property which might otherwise constitute a trespass.

See also

 Adverse inference
 Adverse party
 Adverse possession
 Adverse witness

Notes

Legal terminology